The Epistolae (Spinoza) are the correspondence of the Dutch philosopher Benedictus de Spinoza (1633-1677) with a number of well-known learned men and with Spinoza's admirers, which Spinoza's followers in Amsterdam published after his death in the Opera Posthuma (Dutch translated edition: De nagelate schriften, 1677) Spinoza preserved the letters he received as well as the rough drafts of the letters he sent; 88 letters about mostly philosophical subjects have been preserved: 50 by Spinoza and 38 by his correspondents, 52 written in Latin and 26 in Dutch. The letters concern subjects from the works by Spinoza (for instance infinity and the attributes (properties) of "God", Spinoza's concept of the universe) but also about ghosts and scientific discoveries as the vacuum.

Quote on friendship

Correspondents

Benedictus de Spinoza's correspondents include, with the years of their letters:
 Willem van Blijenbergh (1632–1696), 1664-1665 
 A Dordrecht grain merchant, regent and writer , who corresponded with Spinoza on free will and after Spinoza's death published books opposing his Tractatus Theologico-Politicus and Ethica. Letters WvB to Spinoza (Gebhardt letter number 18: 12-12-1664, 20: 16-01-1665, 22: 19-02-1665, 24: 27-03-1665) and Spinoza to WvB (Gebhardt letter number 19: 05-01-1665, 21, 23: 13-03-1665, 27: 03-06-1665).
 Johannes Bouwmeester, 1665-1666, 1673 
 Hugo Boxel Danielsz, 1674
 Robert Boyle, 1663
 Albert Burgh (franciscan), 1675
 The franciscan Albert Burgh (1650-1708) wrote to Spinoza from Rome to challenge his rationalistic errors and disbelief in Christ. Spinoza's answer is famous: it is ridiculous that the Roman-Catholic Church damns people who are misled by the devil for eternity, while the devil himself is not punished. 
 Johann Georg Graevius, 1673
 Johannes Hudde, 1666, 1671 
 Gottfried Leibniz
 In 1676 Leibniz visited Spinoza to discuss metempsychosis/reincarnation as in Pythagoras's work. Leibniz kept his visit secret. In 1714 he published a moderate vision that reconciled religion and science.
 Lodewijk Meyer, 1663 
 Henry Oldenburg, 1661-1663, 1665, 1675-167
 Petrus Serrarius (Pieter Serrurier) introduced Oldenburg, secretary of the Royal Society in London, to Spinoza and served as a courier for the letters between Oldenburg and Spinoza. 
 Jacob Ostens, 1671
 Jan Rieuwertszn Sr., 1674
 George Hermann Schuller, 1674-1676
 Nicholas Steno, 1671 
 Ehrenfried Walther von Tschirnhaus, 1674-1676
 Spinoza took the initiative for a correspondence with German physicist and mathematician Ehrenfried Walther von Tschirnhaus, who had studied in Leiden. According to Jonathan Israel Spinoza was inspired and stimulated in his later years by discussions with von Tschirnhaus about free will, human motivation and the mechanical laws of motion of Descartes. Von Tschirnhaus visited Spinoza and through Spinoza came into contact with Henry Oldenburg, secretary of the Royal Society in London.
 Simon Joosten de Vries, 1663
 Lambert van Velthuysen, 1671, 1675
 The Utrecht physician Lambert van Velthuysen (1622-1685) had criticised Spinoza's concept of God. He accused Spinoza of a blind surrender to Fate: fatalism. The God defined by Spinoza possessed no divine will, so according to Van Velthuysen this God could not be any longer the touchstone for 'good' and 'evil'. Morals and virtue were endangered this way, leading to insecurity. Furthermore, the authority of the Bible was undermined, for when God was not able to procure a moral judgment, the Bible was nothing more than rhetoric. Spinoza was not impressed and sent Van Velthuysen a strongly worded refutation.
Nonetheless Spinoza and Van Velthuysen remained in contact: starting with 1673 they visited regularly and assisted each other with publications. In the conflict of Descartes with the Utrecht theologian Gisbertus Voetius both sided with Descartes.

Literature
 
  Dutch translation.
   hbk (hardback);  sbk (softback).

References

External links
 wikisource Epistolae (Benedictus de Spinoza) Epistolae 1-4, 8, other answer op 6, 15, 26-29, 39-42, 50, 61-71, 72? ("LXII" (62) error, should be LXXII (72)?)
  
  PDF of the Latin text.
   Latin text of an anthology of the letters (Epistolae). Furthermore full text of three works by Benedictus de Spinoza: Ethica ordine geometrico demonstrata, Tractatus de Intellectus Emendatione and Tractatus Politicus.
 . Latin text with a French translation, incomplete.
Baruch Spinoza
Collections of letters